Troy Kenneth Andrews, OAM(born 1 December 1961)  is an Australian wheelchair basketball player and shooter, who has represented Australia at five Paralympics from 1984 to 2000.  He was born in the New South Wales city of Broken Hill.  At the 1984 New York/Stoke Mandeville Games, he came fourth in the Men's Air Pistol 2-6 - event. He was part of the Australia men's national wheelchair basketball team at the 1988 Seoul, 1992 Barcelona, 1996 Atlanta, and 2000 Sydney Games. He won a gold medal as part of the winning Australian team in 1996, for which he received a Medal of the Order of Australia. In 2000, he received an Australian Sports Medal.

References

Paralympic wheelchair basketball players of Australia
Paralympic shooters of Australia
Paralympic gold medalists for Australia
Wheelchair category Paralympic competitors
Shooters at the 1984 Summer Paralympics
Wheelchair basketball players at the 1988 Summer Paralympics
Wheelchair basketball players at the 1992 Summer Paralympics
Wheelchair basketball players at the 1996 Summer Paralympics
Wheelchair basketball players at the 2000 Summer Paralympics
Medalists at the 1996 Summer Paralympics
Recipients of the Medal of the Order of Australia
Recipients of the Australian Sports Medal
People from Broken Hill, New South Wales
Basketball players from Adelaide
Sportsmen from New South Wales
1961 births
Living people
Paralympic medalists in wheelchair basketball